The Hayden Memorial Geological Award is presented by the Academy of Natural Sciences of Drexel University (formerly the Academy of Natural Sciences of Philadelphia), Philadelphia, Pennsylvania, USA. It was named after US geologist Ferdinand Vandeveer Hayden. The award was established in 1888 and first awarded in 1890.

Laureates
1890 — James Hall
1891 — Edward D. Cope
1892 — Eduard Suess
1893 — Thomas H. Huxley
1894 — Gabriel Auguste Daubrée
1895 — Karl A. von Zittel
1896 — Giovanni Capellini
1897 — A. Karpinski
1898 — Otto Torell
1899 — Gilles Joseph Gustave Dewalque
1902 — Archibald Geikie
1905 — Charles Doolittle Walcott
1908 — John Mason Clarke
1911 — John C. Branner
1914 — Henry Fairfield Osborn
1917 — William Morris Davis
1920 — Thomas Chrowder Chamberlin
1923 — Alfred Lacroix
1926 — William B. Scott
1929 — Charles Schuchert
1932 — Reginald A. Daly
1935 — Andrew C. Lawson
1938 — Arthur Smith Woodward
1941 — Amadeus W. Grabau
1944 — Joseph A. Cushman
1947 — Paul Niggli
1950 — George Gaylord Simpson
1953 — Norman L. Bowen
1956 — Raymond C. Moore
1959 — Carl O. Dunbar
1962 — Alfred S. Romer
1965 — Norman D. Newell
1968 — Elso S. Barghoorn
1971 — Wilmot Hyde Bradley
1979 — Daniel I. Axelrod
1982 — Stephen Jay Gould
1986 — John Ostrom
1997 — Edwin Colbert
2007 — Edward B. Daeschler

See also
List of geology awards
Prizes named after people

References

American science and technology awards
Geology awards
Awards established in 1888
1888 establishments in the United States